The 2014 Open BNP Paribas Banque de Bretagne was a professional tennis tournament played on hard courts. It was the fourth edition of the tournament which was part of the 2014 ATP Challenger Tour. It took place in Quimper, France between 10 and 16 February 2014.

Singles main-draw entrants

Seeds

1 Rankings as of February 3, 2014.

Other entrants
The following players received wildcards into the singles main draw:
  Jonathan Eysseric
  Quentin Halys
  Gilles Müller
  Josselin Ouanna

The following players received entry from the qualifying draw:
  Mathieu Rodrigues
  Jules Marie
  Rudy Coco
  Gleb Sakharov

Champions

Singles

 Pierre-Hugues Herbert def.  Vincent Millot, 7–5, 6–4

Doubles

 Pierre-Hugues Herbert /  Albano Olivetti def.  Toni Androić /  Nikola Mektić, 6–4, 6–3

External links
Official Website

Open BNP Paribas Banque de Bretagne
Open BNP Paribas Banque de Bretagne
Open BNP Paribas Banque de Bretagne
Open BNP Paribas Banque de Bretagne